Maxwell Gyamfi (born 18 January 2000) is a German professional footballer who plays as a centre-back for 3. Liga club VfL Osnabrück.

Career

Early career
Born in Dortmund, Gyamfi spent his youth playing in the youth system of several local clubs. Beginning with Dortmund-based TuS Körne at the age of 6, Gyamfi spent time in the academies at Borussia Dortmund, Schalke 04, and Hombrucher SV before joining VfL Bochum in 2017.

VfL Bochum
Gyamfi joined Bochum in July 2017, appearing sporadically with the club's U19 outfit during the 2017–18 U19 Bundesliga season. He would score his first and only U19 Bundesliga goal on 21 April 2018 in a 2–0 victory over Fortuna Düsseldorf's U19 squad. In June 2019, Gyamfi was offered a professional contract with the club. He appeared in several matchday squads during the ensuing 2. Bundesliga season, but failed to register any competitive appearances with the senior squad.

Hamburger SV II
Following the 2019–20 season, Gyamfi moved to Hamburger SV, joining the club's second team which competed in the Regionalliga. He made his competitive debut for Hamburger II on 6 September 2020 in a 1–1 draw with LSK Hansa. Following the 2021–22 season, Gyamfi's contract was not extended and he became a free agent.

VfL Osnabrück
In June 2022, Gyamfi joined 3. Liga club VfL Osnabrück. He made his competitive debut for the club on 22 July 2022 in a 1–0 victory over MSV Duisburg. In November, Gyamfi signed a contract extension with the club.

Career statistics

Club

References

External links

Maxwell Gyamfi at Eurosport

2000 births
Living people
German people of Ghanaian descent
German footballers
Footballers from Dortmund
Association football central defenders
3. Liga players
Regionalliga players
Hamburger SV II players
VfL Osnabrück players